Toreador may refer to:
 Torero or bullfighter
 The Toreador, a musical comedy
 The "Toreador Song" from Georges Bizet's opera Carmen
 The Daily Toreador, the student newspaper of Texas Tech University
 The Hallucinogenic Toreador is the name of a Salvador Dalí painting
 "Toreador I" and "Toreador II", songs made by Apocalyptica
 "Toreador", a song by Band of Skulls on their 2014 album Himalayan
 The mascot for Boone High School in Boone, Iowa, U.S.
 Toreador (World of Darkness), a fictional clan of vampires in Vampire: The Masquerade and Vampire: The Dark Ages
 The mascot for Monterey High School in Monterey, California, United States
 adiosToreador, the username for Tavros Nitram, a fictional character in the web comic Homestuck
 "El Toreador", a song by The Charlie Daniels Band on their 1980 album Full Moon
 "El Toreador", a song by Gil Evans on his 1964 album The Individualism of Gil Evans
 , a German cargo ship in service 1909–16